Mark Louis Recchi (born February 1, 1968) is a Canadian former professional ice hockey player and former assistant coach. Recchi played 22 seasons in the National Hockey League (NHL), playing for the Pittsburgh Penguins, Philadelphia Flyers, Montreal Canadiens, Carolina Hurricanes, Atlanta Thrashers, Tampa Bay Lightning and Boston Bruins. Recchi won three Stanley Cups in his playing career: in 1991 with the Penguins, in 2006 with the Hurricanes, and in 2011 with the Bruins. Recchi was the last active player who had played in the NHL in the 1980s. In Game 2 of the 2011 Finals, at the age of 43, Recchi became the oldest player ever to score in a Stanley Cup Finals game. On June 26, 2017, in his fourth year of eligibility, Recchi was elected into the Hockey Hall of Fame.

Playing career
Recchi played his junior hockey for the Kamloops Blazers of the Western Hockey League (WHL). His number 8 was retired by the team shortly after he left for the NHL. He was drafted by the Pittsburgh Penguins, first playing in the NHL in 1988, and was a key player on their Stanley Cup-winning team in 1991.

The following season, Recchi was traded to the Philadelphia Flyers as part of a deal that brought Rick Tocchet and Kjell Samuelsson to Pittsburgh. He played for Philadelphia from 1992 to 1995 as part of the "Crazy Eights" line with Eric Lindros and Brent Fedyk, including a 53-goal, 70-assist and 123-point season in 1992–93, still the Flyers' single-season point-scoring record. In 1995, he was traded to the Montreal Canadiens in a deal for Éric Desjardins, Gilbert Dionne and John LeClair, but was reacquired by the Flyers late in the 1998–99 season and was consistently among their top scorers.

During the 1999–2000 season, Recchi was a finalist for the Lester B. Pearson Award as the National Hockey League Players' Association (NHLPA) MVP, and he finished third in scoring, only five points behind winner Jaromír Jágr and runner-up Pavel Bure. Recchi also finished third in voting for the NHL All-Star team right wing position behind Jágr and Bure. In 2000 and 2004, the Flyers would make the Eastern Conference Finals, but they would bow out of each series in seven games.

In 2000, Recchi was named "Kamloops Male Athlete of the 20th Century", and had a street named "Mark Recchi Way" in his honour.

In August 2004, Recchi rejoined the Pittsburgh Penguins as a free agent, signing a two-year contract with a two-way option for a third year. The first year was eventually nullified by the NHL lock-out; in the second year, with the Penguins languishing at the bottom of the NHL standings, Recchi waived his no-trade clause to be sent to the Stanley Cup-contending Carolina Hurricanes at the deadline for minor-league forward Krys Kolanos, left wing Niklas Nordgren and a 2007 second-round pick. Recchi won his second Stanley Cup with the Hurricanes that season, then re-signed with the Penguins during the summer of 2006 off-season.

On January 20, 2007, he scored his seventh career hat-trick (against the Toronto Maple Leafs), and just under a week later, Recchi scored his 500th career goal on January 26, 2007, on the power play against the Dallas Stars.

During the summer of 2007, Recchi re-signed with the Pittsburgh Penguins on a one-year, $2 million contract, but on December 4, he was placed on waivers and assigned to their American Hockey League (AHL) affiliate, the Wilkes-Barre/Scranton Penguins, on December 6. The Penguins then placed Recchi on re-entry waivers the next day, where Recchi was claimed by the Atlanta Thrashers. In his first game against his former team, he scored the game-winning goal in a shootout.

On July 7, 2008, Recchi signed a one-year deal as a free agent with the Tampa Bay Lightning. After scoring 45 points in 62 games with the Lightning in the 2008–09 season, and with the Lightning out of playoff contention, on March 4, 2009, Recchi was traded at the trade deadline (along with a second-round pick in 2010) to the Boston Bruins in exchange for Mārtiņš Karsums and Matt Lashoff. Recchi scored his first two goals for the Bruins three days later on March 7, as the first and third Bruins goals in a 5–3 home ice defeat of the visiting Chicago Blackhawks.

On July 2, 2009, Recchi re-signed with the Bruins on a one-year contract. At the time, Recchi had stated that the 2009–10 season would be his final year. With the retirement of Joe Sakic in the summer of 2009, Recchi became the leader in points and assists among active players. Recchi would serve as an alternate captain during the season while Marc Savard was injured and out of the line-up, playing 81 of 82 games in the 2009–10 season.

During the 2010 playoffs, Recchi became the third-oldest player to score a playoff goal, behind Chris Chelios and Gordie Howe, and also became the oldest player to have a multi-goal game in the playoffs when he scored two goals in a 5–4 overtime loss to the Philadelphia Flyers in Game 4 of the second round. After suffering defeat in the Eastern Conference Semifinals against the Flyers, instead of retiring, Recchi re-signed with the Bruins for a one more year.

In the 2010–11 season on November 24, 2010, Recchi scored twice against the Florida Panthers to earn his 1,500th career point.

In Game 2 of the 2011 Stanley Cup Finals, Recchi became the oldest ever player to score a goal in a Stanley Cup Final, doing so at age 43.
  In Game 3 of the Finals, he scored the final two goals of his career. On June 15, 2011, Recchi became a three-time winner of the Stanley Cup and joined  Jack Marshall, Frank Foyston, Jack Walker, Mike Keane, Claude Lemieux, Hap Holmes, Al Arbour, Gord Pettinger, Larry Hillman, and Joe Nieuwendyk in winning at least three Stanley Cups with three different teams, as the Bruins defeated the Vancouver Canucks in Game 7 of the Stanley Cup Finals. Recchi also led the team in scoring during the Finals series.

Having previously announced he would "sail off into the sunset" if Boston were victorious in the 2011 Stanley Cup Final, he announced his retirement in an interview with Ron MacLean of Hockey Night in Canada during the post-game Stanley Cup celebration. Recchi was the last player active in professional hockey who had played in the NHL in the 1980s, finishing his career fourth all-time in games played and 12th all-time in points.

Post-retirement
Recchi is a co-owner of the Kamloops Blazers, along with Dallas Stars owner Tom Gaglardi and Jarome Iginla, Shane Doan and Darryl Sydor.

In 2013, Recchi joined the Dallas Stars as a consultant along with former Stars Mike Modano and Marty Turco.

On July 18, 2014, Recchi was hired as the Pittsburgh Penguins' player development coach. He was a part of the 2016 and 2017 Stanley Cup champion teams. He was subsequently promoted to director of player development on June 15, 2017. He was named the assistant coach on July 11, 2017, following the departure of Rick Tocchet, who was named the head coach of the Arizona Coyotes.

Recchi did not have his contract renewed by the Penguins following the 2019-20 season.

Recchi was hired by the New Jersey Devils as an assistant coach on September 8, 2020. He was subsequently fired by the Devils on May 4, 2022.

Personal life
Mark Recchi was born on February 1, 1968, to Mel and Ruth Recchi in Kamloops, British Columbia. Mark has three brothers: Marty, Mike and Matt.

Recchi married Kim Lazur on August 20, 2016, and they have two children together. Recchi has six children in total, four from a previous marriage. The children's names are: Christina, Bella, Samantha, Brendan, Cameron and Austin.

Awards and achievements
Inducted into the Hockey Hall of Fame in 2017

Records
 His 123 points (53 goals, 70 assists) in the 1992–1993 season is the Flyers regular season scoring record.
 Oldest player to record 5 assists in a game on March 1, 2009, at 41 years, 28 days.
 Oldest player to score a Stanley Cup Finals goal on June 6, 2011, at 43 years, 126 days.

NHL transactions
On February 19, 1992: Traded from the Pittsburgh Penguins with Brian Benning and a first-round pick in the 1992 draft (Jason Bowen) to the Philadelphia Flyers for Kjell Samuelsson, Rick Tocchet and Ken Wregget.
On February 9, 1995: Traded from the Philadelphia Flyers to the Montreal Canadiens for Éric Desjardins, John LeClair and Gilbert Dionne.
On March 10, 1999: Traded from the Montreal Canadiens to the Philadelphia Flyers for Dainius Zubrus, a second-round pick in the 1999 draft (Matt Carkner) and a sixth-round pick in the 2000 draft (Scott Selig).
On March 9, 2006: Traded from the Pittsburgh Penguins to the Carolina Hurricanes for Niklas Nordgren, Krys Kolanos and a second-round pick in the 2007 draft (Kevin Marshall).
On December 4, 2007: Placed on waivers by the Pittsburgh Penguins
On December 6, 2007: Assigned to the Pittsburgh Penguins American Hockey League affiliate, the Wilkes-Barre/Scranton Penguins, after clearing waivers.
On December 7, 2007: Claimed off re-entry waivers by the Atlanta Thrashers.
On March 4, 2009: Traded to the Boston Bruins from the Tampa Bay Lightning with a 2010 second-round pick, for defenceman Matt Lashoff and forward Mārtiņš Karsums.
On June 15, 2011: Retired from the National Hockey League

Career statistics

Regular season and playoffs

International

See also
 List of NHL players with 1000 games played
 List of NHL players with 500 goals
 List of NHL players with 1000 points
 List of NHL statistical leaders

References

External links

 
Mark Recchi's Day With the Stanley Cup

1968 births
Living people
Atlanta Thrashers players
Boston Bruins players
Canadian ice hockey right wingers
Canadian people of Italian descent
Carolina Hurricanes players
Dallas Stars personnel
Hockey Hall of Fame inductees
Ice hockey people from British Columbia
Ice hockey players at the 1998 Winter Olympics
Kamloops Blazers players
Langley Eagles players
Montreal Canadiens players
Muskegon Lumberjacks players
National Hockey League All-Stars
New Jersey Devils coaches
New Westminster Bruins players
Olympic ice hockey players of Canada
Philadelphia Flyers players
Pittsburgh Penguins coaches
Pittsburgh Penguins draft picks
Pittsburgh Penguins players
Sportspeople from Kamloops
Stanley Cup champions
Tampa Bay Lightning players
Canadian ice hockey coaches